Teo Đogaš (born 19 February 1977 in Split) is a water polo player from Croatia, who was a member of the men's national team that won the world title at the 2007 World Aquatics Championships in Melbourne, Australia. At club level, Đogaš played most notably for Olympiacos, HAVK Mladost, POŠK Split, Jadran Split, AS Pescara and VA Cattaro.

Honours

Club
POŠK Split
 LEN Champions League (1): 1998–99
 Croatian Cup (1): 1999–00
Olympiacos
 Greek Water Polo League (1): 2000–01
 Greek Cup (1): 2000–01
 LEN Champions League Runner-up: 2000–01
HAVK Mladost
 Croatian League (1): 2007–08
 Croatian Cup (1): 2004–05
VA Cattaro
 LEN Euro Cup (1): 2009–10

See also
 List of world champions in men's water polo
 List of World Aquatics Championships medalists in water polo

References

External links
 
 Teo Đogaš career highlights, bio and interview page 207, A Century of Croatian Water Polo, Teo Đogaš - The Water Cobra
 Profile at hvs.hr 

1977 births
Living people
Croatian male water polo players
Olympiacos Water Polo Club players
Water polo players from Split, Croatia
Olympic water polo players of Croatia
Water polo players at the 2008 Summer Olympics
World Aquatics Championships medalists in water polo